Peter Browne  (1794-1872) was an Irish politician.

Browne was born in Dublin and educated at Trinity College there. He was Member of Parliament (MP) for   Rye from 1818 until 1826.

References 

1794 births
Politicians from Dublin (city)
1872 deaths
Members of the Parliament of the United Kingdom for English constituencies
UK MPs 1818–1820
UK MPs 1820–1826